Emanuel Lehman (born Mendel Lehmann; February 15, 1827 – January 10, 1907) was a German-born American banker. The younger brother of Henry Lehman and older brother of Mayer Lehman, he was a co-founder of Lehman Brothers.

Biography
Emanuel Lehman was born in Rimpar, Bavaria on February 15, 1827, the son of Eva (Rosenheim) and Abraham Lehmann, a cattle merchant. He traveled to the United States in 1847 to join his brother Henry in business.

He married Pauline Sondheim in May 1859, and they had four children. His wife died in 1871.

When the newly formed Mutual Alliance Trust Company opened for business in New York on the Tuesday after June 29, 1902, there were 13 directors, including Lehman, William Rockefeller, and Cornelius Vanderbilt.

Philanthropy and family
In 1897, he donated $100,000 (equivalent to $ million in ) to the Hebrew Orphan Asylum of New York, under the condition "to enlarge and perpetuate its usefulness." In May 1859, he married Pauline Sondheim, daughter of Louis Sondheim of New York. Pauline died in 1871. They had four children: Milton Lehman; Philip Lehman, a partner in the firm; Harriet Philip Lehman, and Evelyn Philip Lehman. He was of Jewish background.

See also
Lehman family

References

1827 births
1907 deaths
American bankers
German bankers
German emigrants to the United States
19th-century German Jews
Lehman Brothers people
Lehman family
Mutual Alliance Trust Company people
People from Würzburg (district)